Lonicera pyrenaica, commonly known as Pyrenean honeysuckle, is a species of honeysuckle native to the eastern Pyrenees and the Balearic Islands. It is widely cultivated as a garden plant.

References

pyrenaica
Flora of Spain
Plants described in 1753
Taxa named by Carl Linnaeus